List includes bills that were introduced in the 8th National Assembly.

General 
Bill can be submitted to the National Assembly by:

the Government,
MP,
National Council or
5,000 voters.

Legislative procedure begins when Speaker passes bill to the MPs.

There are 3 possible legislative procedures:

regular legislative procedure,
shortened legislative procedure or
urgent legislative procedure.

Bills are usually passed with the majority of the present  MPs. If the Constitution demands a two thirds majority (laws regulating electoral systems, referendums and constitutional laws which amend the Constitution) then at least 60 MPs have to vote in favor of the bill to pass it.

Legend 

Acronyms for Ministries:

Bills proposed by the government 
Full list of the bills is available on the National Assembly website.

Bills proposed by MPs

Bills proposed by the National Council

Bills proposed by voters 
No bills yet.

National Assembly (Slovenia)
8th National Assembly (Slovenia)